The Roman Catholic Diocese of Prince-Albert, in Saskatchewan, is a Latin suffragan in the western Canadian ecclesiastical province of the Metropolitan Archdiocese of Regina.

Its cathedral episcopal see is Sacred Heart Cathedral, at Prince Albert, Saskatchewan. It also has the National Shrine of the Little Flower, in Wakaw, Saskatchewan.

History 

 Established on 4 June 1891 as Apostolic Vicariate of Saskatchewan on territory slit off from the Metropolitan Archdiocese of Saint-Boniface.
 Promoted on 1907.12.02 as Diocese of Prince-Albert / Principis Alberten(sis) (Latin)
 Lost territory on 1910.03.04 to establish the Apostolic Vicariate of Keewatin.
 Renamed on 1921.04.30 as Diocese of Prince-Albert–Saskatoon. 
 Lost territory on 1921.05.06 to establish the Territorial Abbacy of Saint Peter–Muenster.
Renamed (back) on 1933.06.09 as Diocese of Prince-Albert, having gained territory from Apostolic Vicariate of Keewatin and lost territory to establish the Diocese of Saskatoon.

Statistics 
As per 2014, it pastorally served 40,800 Catholics (20.5% of 198,600 total) on 118,834 km² in 80 parishes with 62 priests (47 diocesan, 15 religious), 1 deacon, 79 lay religious (15 brothers, 64 sisters) and 2 seminarians.)

Bishops
(all Roman Rite, often members of Latin congregations)

Apostolic Vicar of Saskatchewan 
 Albert Pascal, Missionary Oblates of Mary Immaculate (O.M.I.) (1891.06.02 – 1907.12.02 see below), Titular Bishop of Mosynopolis (1891.06.02 – 1907.12.02)

Suffragan Bishop of Prince-Albert (first time)
 Albert Pascal, O.M.I. (see above 1907.12.02 – death 1920.07.12)

Suffragan Bishop of Prince-Albert–Saskatoon
 Henri-Jean-Maria Prud'homme (1921.06.16 – 1933.06.09 see below)

Suffragan Bishops of Prince-Albert (again)
 Henri-Jean-Maria Prud'homme (see above 1933.06.09 – retired 1937.01.29), emeritate as Titular Bishop of Saldæ (1937.01.29 – death 1952.01.05)
 Réginald Duprat, Dominican order (O.P.) (1938.03.17 – retired 1952.06.29), emeritate as Titular Bishop of Tremithus (1952.06.29 – death 1954.02.13)
 Léo Blais (1952.07.04 – 1959.02.28); next Titular Bishop of Hieron (1959.03.18 – death 1991.01.21), first as Auxiliary Bishop of Montréal (Quebec, Canada) (1959.03.18 – 1971.05.11), then on emeritate
 Laurent Morin (1959.02.28 – retired 1983.04.09), previously Titular Bishop of Arsamosata (1955.09.08 – 1959.02.28) as Auxiliary Bishop of Montréal (Quebec, Canada) (1955.09.08 – 1959.02.28); died 1996
 Blaise-Ernest Morand (1983.04.09 – retired 2008.05.26), succeeded as former Coadjutor Bishop of Prince-Albert (1981.04.22 – 1983.04.09)
 Albert Privet Thévenot, White Fathers (M. Afr.) (2008.05.26 – retired 2021.03.25)
 Stephen Andrew Hero (2021.03.25 – ...)

Coadjutor bishop
 Blaise-Ernest Morand (1981-1983)

References

Sources and external links 
 Roman Catholic Diocese of Prince Albert site
 GCatholic with Google map and - satellite photo - data for all sections

Roman Catholic Ecclesiastical Province of Regina